Atluri Poornachandra Rao (4 April 1925 – 29 October 2017) was an Indian film producer and communist leader. As a film producer he produced several films between 1960s till 2005. Aadabaduchu (1967), Mathrudevata (1969), Papam Pasivadu (1972), Venky (2004) were some of his notable films. Aunanna Kadanna (2005) starring Uday Kiran was his last film as a producer.

Early life 
Purnachandra Rao was born in a middle-class family on 4 April 1925 in Vanapamula village in Krishna district of Andhra Pradesh. He moved to Hyderabad in late 1950s and shifted to Chennai later to pursue a career in films. He married Marudwati and the couple has two sons.

He was influenced by left ideology and participated in the rationalist movement led by Gora. He was a member of united Communist Party and was arrested multiple times.

Filmography 
 Aadabaduchu
 Mathrudevatha
 Sthree
 Koothuru Kodalu (1971)
 Devudu Chesina Pelli (1974)
 Ram Balram (1980)
 Maang Bharo Sajana (1980)
 Ek Hi Bhool (1981)
 Chattaniki Kallu Levu (1981)
 Mugguru Monagallu (1983)
 Andha Kanoon (1983)
 John Jani Janardhan (1984)
 Aakhree Raasta (1986)
 Sansar (1987)
 Chaalbaaz (1989)
 Aaplee Maanse (1992)
 Kothachilo (1994) 
 Akuha Katha (1994)
 Venky (2004)
 Mr & Mrs Sailaja Krishnamurthy (2004)
 Aunanna Kadanna (2005)

He is healthy and enjoying his retirement.

References 

1925 births
2017 deaths
Film producers from Andhra Pradesh
Communist Party of India politicians from Andhra Pradesh
People from Krishna district